Rudy Collins (July 24, 1934 – August 15, 1988) was an American jazz drummer born in New York City.

Collins played trombone in high school and started on drums at that time as well. He studied with Sam Ulano during 1953–57 and began gigging in New York City, playing with Hot Lips Page, Cootie Williams, Eddie Bonnemere, Dizzy Gillespie, Johnny Smith, Carmen McRae, Cab Calloway, and Roy Eldridge. he played with J.J. Johnson and Kai Winding at the Newport Jazz Festival.

Later in the 1950s Collins became increasingly interested in the nascent free jazz scene, in addition to playing with more traditional ensembles. He worked with Herbie Mann from 1959 and later with Cecil Taylor, Quincy Jones, Dave Pike, and Lalo Schifrin.

His last recordings were in 1981.

Discography
With Ahmed Abdul-Malik
Sounds of Africa (New Jazz, 1962)
With Gene Ammons
Night Lights (Prestige, 1970 [1985])
With Ray Bryant
The Ray Bryant Touch (Cadet, 1967)
With Billy Butler
This Is Billy Butler! (Prestige, 1968)
With Dizzy Gillespie
The New Continent (Limelight, 1962)
New Wave (Phillips, 1963)
Dizzy Gillespie and the Double Six of Paris (Phillips, 1963)
Something Old, Something New (Phillips, 1964)
Jambo Caribe (Limelight, 1964)
I/We Had a Ball (Limelight, 1965) - 1 track
 Paris Jazz Concert Olympia Nov 24th 1965 (Laserlight (2002)
With J. J. Johnson and Kai Winding
Dave Brubeck and Jay & Kai at Newport (Columbia, 1956)
With Junior Mance
Live at the Top (Atlantic, 1968)
With Herbie Mann
Flute, Brass, Vibes and Percussion (Verve, 1959)
The Common Ground (Atlantic, 1960)
The Family of Mann (Atlantic, 1961)
Herbie Mann at the Village Gate (Atlantic, 1961)
Herbie Mann Returns to the Village Gate (Atlantic, 1961 [1963])
Our Mann Flute (Atlantic, 1966)
With James Moody
Comin' On Strong (Argo, 1963)
With the Jimmy Owens-Kenny Barron Quintet
You Had Better Listen (Atlantic, 1967) 
With Dave Pike
Bossa Nova Carnival (New Jazz, 1962)
With Lalo Schifrin
Lalo = Brilliance (Roulette, 1962)
Bossa Nova: New Brazilian Jazz (Audio Fidelity, 1962)
Piano, Strings and Bossa Nova (MGM, 1962)
With Randy Weston
Tanjah (Polydor, 1973)
With Leo Wright
Suddenly the Blues (Atlantic, 1962)
With Quincy Jones
Big Band Bossa Nova (Mercury, 1962)

References
[ Rudy Collins] at Allmusic

1934 births
1988 deaths
American jazz drummers
Musicians from New York (state)
20th-century American drummers
American male drummers
20th-century American male musicians
American male jazz musicians